Neustift may refer to the following places in Austria:

Neustift im Stubaital, in Tyrol
Maria Neustift, in Upper Austria
Neustift im Mühlkreis, in Upper Austria
Neustift an der Lafnitz, in Burgenland
Neustift bei Güssing, in Burgenland
Neustift-Innermanzing, in Lower Austria

See also
Stift (disambiguation)